David L. Higgins (born 16 February 1968) is an Australian Paralympic archery silver medalist. A paraplegic from the Lake Macquarie suburb of Eleebana,  he started archery at the age of eleven and two years later he became the first paraplegic in Australia to qualify for a national championship in archery against able-bodied archers.  He was Australia's youngest team member at the age of 16 at the 1984 New York/Stoke Mandeville Paralympics. He won a silver medal in the Men's Short Metric Round Team 1A–6 event and finished 7th in the Men's Double Advanced Metric Round Paraplegic event.

References

External links
 

Paralympic archers of Australia
Archers at the 1984 Summer Paralympics
Paralympic silver medalists for Australia
Wheelchair category Paralympic competitors
People with paraplegia
Sportspeople from Newcastle, New South Wales
1968 births
Living people
Medalists at the 1984 Summer Paralympics
Australian male archers
Paralympic medalists in archery